Live Taste is the third album and first live album by Irish rock band Taste. It was recorded live at Montreux Casino in Switzerland in 1970 and released in February 1971, shortly after the band broke up at the end of 1970.

Track listing
"Sugar Mama" (Traditional; arranged by Rory Gallagher) – 8:13
"Gamblin' Blues" (Melvin Jackson) – 6:22
"I Feel So Good (Part 1)" (Big Bill Broonzy) – 3:31
"I Feel So Good (Part 2)" (Big Bill Broonzy) – 4:02
"Catfish" (Traditional; arranged by Rory Gallagher) – 10:43
"Same Old Story" (Rory Gallagher) – 5:43

Personnel
Taste
Rory Gallagher – guitars, vocals, Harmonica
Richard "Charlie" McCracken – bass guitar
John Wilson – drums

Charts

Notes

1971 live albums
Taste (band) albums
Polydor Records live albums